Scleria biflora is a plant in the family Cyperaceae. It grows as a tufted annual grass.

Distribution and habitat
Scleria biflora grows widely in India, Sri Lanka, Nepal, China, Taiwan, Japan, Burma, Thailand, Vietnam, Indonesia, Malaysia and Philippines. Its habitat is most frequently in moist, shady places, and sometimes in wet scrubland and in rice fields. It is found from sea level to  altitude.

References

biflora
Flora of China
Flora of Taiwan
Flora of Japan
Flora of tropical Asia